Chris Amon Racing, also known simply as Amon, was a Formula One team established by New Zealand driver Chris Amon. It competed as a privateer team in the 1966 Italian Grand Prix, then as a constructor in its own right in the 1974 Formula One season.

Background
With most of the other cars running 3-litre engines, Amon struggled in qualifying and failed to make the grid.

From  until , Amon drove for Ferrari, March and Matra, winning several non-championship F1 races while developing a reputation for bad luck in World Championship events. Financial backing came from John Dalton, and the car, designed by Fowell, followed the Lotus 72 in some areas of construction, with sophisticated torsion-bar suspension and side radiators.

The venture failed completely: retiring from the first race, Amon withdrew from the second, and the car was unable to qualify for two more before the team closed down due to financial problems.

Amon AF101

The AF101 was the only Formula One car built by Amon Racing; the AF101 designation deriving from A for Amon and F for Fowell. Fowell and Tom Boyce designed the car which featured a single central fuel tank, titanium torsion bars and a forward driving position. One unusual (for the time) feature of the AF101 was that the fuel tank was located between the driver's cockpit and the engine. Structurally, it proved to be weak and was not ready for a Formula One appearance until the fourth race of the season, the Spanish Grand Prix. Amon was only able to qualify 23rd, due to brake-disc vibration that became worse with the tyres required for the wet race that followed. Despite cautious driving, a brake shaft finally broke and Amon was forced to retire after 22 laps.

Following further work and testing, Amon returned for the Monaco Grand Prix and qualified twentieth, but due to mechanical problems, he was unable to start the race. Further problems meant Amon was not able to reappear with the AF101 until the German Grand Prix when both Amon and Larry Perkins failed to qualify. Amon did not reappear with the AF101 until the Italian Grand Prix, three races before the end of the season, but this time he was unable to qualify. That signalled the end of both the car and Chris Amon Racing, leaving Amon to close down the team after the race when the money ran out.

Complete Formula One results
(key)

Non-Championship results
(key)

References

External links
F1 Rejects profile

Formula One constructors
Formula One entrants
New Zealand auto racing teams
New Zealand racecar constructors
1966 establishments in New Zealand
1974 disestablishments in New Zealand
Auto racing teams established in 1966
Auto racing teams disestablished in 1974